Terry O'Donnell is an English professional football player and manager.

Career
At the beginning of his career, after a trial at Liverpool FC, he played for semi-pro football club Liverpool Nalgo and a couple of other teams including Oglan United in the Liverpool Sunday league. Then he decided to move to New Zealand on a football contract with his wife Barbara. The condition of his transfer to the football club in New Zealand was playing at a Newton FC in West Cheshire League. He played for them for about three quarters of a season and then the scout Ron Moore, on behalf of Hamilton AFC in Waikato, New Zealand, offered him a two-year contract. Terry O'Donnell stayed with Hamilton AFC for 12 years, won many league and cup championships, became the President of the club for six years. He retired from playing at the age of 37, when Barclay's Merchant Bank, where he was the Regional Manager in the Waikato, offered him a position heading up their international trust company in Vanuatu.

He became the National Coach of Vanuatu and coached club side Shepards United winning the league and cup double in his first season in Vanuatu. From 1987 until 1993 he coached the Vanuatu national football team. In 1990, he won the Melanesia Cup with Vanuatu. This was first and only international sporting triumph so far for the nation and what a celebration! He was awarded the Vanuatu Medal of Honour and also appeared with the team on a series of postage stamps. The Vanuatu team had many successes apart from being the South Pacific Champions, having great success in FIFA competitions and also knocking New Zealand out of the World Cup and being the last South Pacific Island Nation to beat Australia ( 1 v 0 in Port Vila). He received an offer to lead Nasinu F.C. participating in the Fiji league in Suva Fiji, Nasinu made the final of the IDC in the second season. The next club in his career was Kiwi F.C. in Samoa. For the next two seasons the club was undefeated, won the Premier League and Cup double twice and for the first time also he coached the women's Kiwi FC team, who also remained unbeaten winning the league and cup double and the national five-a-side competition.Interview - Oceania's Jose Mourinho - Back Page Football</ref>

References

Year of birth missing (living people)
Living people
English footballers
English football managers
Expatriate football managers in Fiji
Expatriate football managers in Samoa
Expatriate football managers in Vanuatu
Vanuatu national football team managers
Place of birth missing (living people)
English expatriate sportspeople in Fiji
English expatriate sportspeople in Vanuatu
21st-century American politicians
Association footballers not categorized by position
English expatriate sportspeople in Samoa
English expatriate sportspeople in New Zealand